Shelford railway station is on the West Anglia Main Line serving the villages of Great Shelford, Little Shelford and Stapleford in Cambridgeshire, England. Its three-letter station code is SED.

The station and all trains calling are operated by Greater Anglia.

History

Eminent theatre director Sir Peter Hall lived here in his early life when his father Reginald Hall was the stationmaster.

Services
All services at Shelford are operated by Greater Anglia using  EMUs.

The typical off-peak service in trains per hour is:
 1 tph to London Liverpool Street
 1 tph to 

During the peak hours, the service is increased to 2 tph in each direction.

References

External links

Railway stations in Cambridgeshire
DfT Category E stations
Former Great Eastern Railway stations
Railway stations in Great Britain opened in 1845
Greater Anglia franchise railway stations